Handel Ice Piedmont is a large ice piedmont lying north and west of the Colbert Mountains, between Haydn Inlet and Schubert Inlet on the west-central coast of Alexander Island, Antarctica. Apparently first seen from the air by the United States Antarctic Service in 1940 but not separately mapped, it was first mapped from air photos taken by the Ronne Antarctic Research Expedition, 1947–48, by Searle of the Falkland Islands Dependencies Survey in 1960. The feature was named by the UK Antarctic Place-Names Committee for George Frideric Handel, the German composer.

See also 
 Bongrain Ice Piedmont
 Mozart Ice Piedmont

Further reading 
  Jane G. Ferrigno, Alison J. Cook, Amy M. Mathie, Richard S. Williams, Jr., Charles Swithinbank, Kevin M. Foley, Adrian J. Fox, Janet W. Thomson, and Jörn Sievers,  Coastal-Change and Glaciological Map of the Palmer Land Area, Antarctica: 1947–2009 , U.S. Geological Survey Geologic Investigations Series Map I–2600–C, 1 map sheet, 28-p

External links 

 Handel Ice Piedmont on USGS website
 Handel Ice Piedmont on AADC website
 Handel Ice Piedmont on SCAR website

References 

George Frideric Handel
Ice piedmonts of Palmer Land
Bodies of ice of Alexander Island